Monte Penoso is a mountain on the island of Maio, Cape Verde. At 436 m elevation, it is the island highest point. It is situated in the eastern part of the island, 3 km southwest of Pedro Vaz and 13 km northeast of the island capital Porto Inglês. The mountain is of volcanic origin.

See also
List of mountains in Cape Verde
List of protected areas in Cape Verde

References

Penoso
Geography of Maio, Cape Verde
Protected areas of Cape Verde